Crosscut may refer to:

 Crosscut.com, an online newspaper in Seattle
 Crosscut Peak, a mountain peak in Antarctica
 Crosscut Point, a rocky point in the South Sandwich Islands
 CrossCut Records, a German record company
 A type of saw cut, more commonly spelled "cross cut", made by a crosscut saw

See also
 Cross cut (disambiguation)